"Run Up" is a song by American electronic band Major Lazer featuring PartyNextDoor and Nicki Minaj. It was released on YouTube on January 26, 2017, by Mad Decent and Because Music, intended to be the second single from Music Is the Weapon. But it was then confirmed as the second single from Major Lazer Essentials. The song was written by primary Major Lazer member Diplo, Stargate, PartyNextDoor, Minaj, and Phillip Meckseper, while the song's production was handled by Major Lazer, Stargate, and Jr Blender.

Composition
"Run Up" has a length of three minutes and twenty-three seconds. According to the sheet music published by  Kobalt Music Publishing America, Inc on Musicnotes.com, it's written in the key of E Major set in a  time signature at a moderate tempo of 108 beats per minute. The vocal range spans from the low note C3 to the high note C5, while the music follows the chord progression of A–Cm–E–B. Musically, "Run Up" is a dancehall song. PartyNextDoor and Minaj sing using the Jamaican Patois accent.

Reception
"Run Up" received generally positive reviews from music critics. Reviewing the song, Ryan Reed from Rolling Stone described it as "a suave blend of high-pitched vocal samples, warped guitar chords and a signature Caribbean music groove." Him praised the presence of Minaj and PartyNextDoor on the song, "PartyNextDoor croons smooth come-ons throughout the track, but Minaj amps up the intensity with a reliably boastful verse." Kat Being of Billboard call it as "a great follow-up to "Cold Water" (2016). Bianca Gracie from Fuse gave a positive review to the song, writing, "Minaj and Party bring their Trinidadian and Jamaican roots to the track, as the rapstress drops boastful verses laced with swagger, sex appeal and patois." The written also praised the vocal of the singer PartyNextDoor on the song, she wrote: "PartyNextDoor adds his crooning vocals to the opening and hook, which is backed by Major Lazer's island-tinged production."

Spin'''s Brian Josephs commented that the song used "dancehall-inspired production that Drake pimped and Tory Lanez bit." He also praised the feature vocalist on the song writing that "PartyNextDoor and Minaj are charismatic enough to make his a summer banger that’s dropped a couple of months early." Dani Schwartz of the site HotNewHipHop'' also gave a positive review to the song praising the choice of the singers in the song, she describing its as a "only natural, then, they enlist PartyNextDoor and Nicki Minaj, two artists with Caribbean roots."

Charts

Weekly charts

Year-end charts

Certifications

Release history

References

2017 singles
2017 songs
Major Lazer songs
PartyNextDoor songs
Nicki Minaj songs
Dancehall songs
Reggae fusion songs
Songs written by Diplo
Songs written by Mikkel Storleer Eriksen
Songs written by Tor Erik Hermansen
Song recordings produced by Diplo
Song recordings produced by Stargate (record producers)
Songs written by Nicki Minaj
Songs written by PartyNextDoor
Songs written by Jr Blender